The 1971 Argentine Grand Prix was a motor race consisting of a Formula One class and a Formula 5000 class, held at the Buenos Aires circuit in Buenos Aires on 24 January 1971. The Formula One class was not part of the FIA Formula One World Championship.

This event was held because at that time the FIA regulations required a demonstration race to be held as a quality check, before a Grand Prix could be admitted as part of the World Championship. The race was run over two heats of 50 laps each, the final results being an aggregate of the two.

Scuderia Ferrari had entered three cars for this event, but they were withdrawn after the fatal accident suffered by Ignazio Giunti in a sports car race two weeks previously. Jean-Pierre Beltoise was also involved in that accident, and as a consequence had his international license suspended, and was unable to compete.

Qualifying
Note: a blue background indicates a Formula 5000 entrant.

Heat one
Rolf Stommelen won the first heat, leading from the start, from Jo Siffert in second place. Siffert had held off the rest of the field, with Chris Amon passing Reine Wisell before duelling with Henri Pescarolo for third place. The Frenchman won this battle to take third at the finish, with Amon, Wisell and Carlos Reutemann rounding out the top six. Emerson Fittipaldi lost a nose fin and had to pit for a new one, losing three laps. He eventually finished 10th. The retirements were all F5000 cars, namely Jo Bonnier's Lola, which pulled off with a flat battery, and Marincovich's McLaren and Garcia-Veiga's Surtees, which both suffered mechanical failures. Wisell posted the fastest lap.

Heat two
The grid for heat two was decided by the finishing order from the first heat, with Greg Young taking over Marincovich's car. At the start, Siffert pulled away from Stommelen to take the lead. Amon quickly passed Reutemann and Pescarolo to move into third place, but he caught Stommelen just as the German was trying to pass Siffert. Amon and Stommelen collided and Stommelen's Surtees went off the track, causing gearbox damage which soon proved to be terminal. Shortly afterwards, Amon passed Siffert for the lead. During the next two laps, Siffert was also passed by Pescarolo, Reutemann, Derek Bell's March and Wilson Fittipaldi's Lotus. Wisell pitted with handling problems, and Silvio Moser finally started the race after extensive engine work being performed in the pits, meaning he missed the start. Wilson Fittipaldi then retired on lap 21 with engine failure, and Wisell and Moser also retired. Bell passed Reutemann but retired after that with another engine failure. Siffert had also retired his March with broken suspension. Amon won the heat by 22 seconds from Pescarolo, and this margin gave him the overall victory, his only win of the season. He also posted the fastest lap of the heat, which was the overall fastest lap.

Classification
Note: the classification was determined using the sum of the times obtained in the two heats.

References

"The Motor Racing Year No. 3", Anthony Pritchard, Pelham Books, 1972.

Argentine Grand Prix
Argentine Grand Prix
Formula 5000 race reports
Grand Prix
Argentine Grand Prix